This is a list of albums that reached number-one on the ARIA Hip Hop/R&B Albums Chart in 2023. The ARIA Hip Hop/R&B Albums Chart is a weekly chart that ranks the best-performing hip hop and R&B albums in Australia. It is published by the Australian Recording Industry Association (ARIA), an organisation that collects music data for the weekly ARIA Charts. To be eligible to appear on the chart, the recording must be an album of a predominantly urban nature.

Chart history

See also

2023 in music
List of number-one albums of 2023 (Australia)

References

Australia Urban
Urban 2023
Number-one Urban albums